Pieter Jacobus "Koos" Verdam (15 January 1915 – 11 March 1998) was a Dutch politician of the defunct Anti-Revolutionary Party (ARP) now merged into the Christian Democratic Appeal (CDA).

The reformed Verdam was a professor for Roman law and international civil law at the Vrije Universiteit Amsterdam and from 1959 to 1960 its Rector Magnificus. From 1966 to 1967 he was the Minister of the Interior and Kingdom Relations in the Cabinet Zijlstra. In 1970 he became the Queen's Commissioner in Utrecht.

Decorations

References

External links

Official
  Mr.Dr. P.J. (Koos) Verdam Parlement & Politiek
  Mr.Dr. P.J. Verdam (ARP) Eerste Kamer der Staten-Generaal

 

 

1915 births
1998 deaths
Anti-Revolutionary Party politicians
Dutch academic administrators
Dutch legal scholars
Dutch jurists
Grand Officers of the Order of Orange-Nassau
International law scholars
Knights of the Order of the Netherlands Lion
King's and Queen's Commissioners of Utrecht
Members of the Senate (Netherlands)
Ministers of the Interior of the Netherlands
Politicians from Amsterdam
People from De Bilt
Rectors of universities in the Netherlands
Reformed Churches Christians from the Netherlands
Scholars of Roman law
Vrije Universiteit Amsterdam alumni
Academic staff of Vrije Universiteit Amsterdam
20th-century Dutch politicians